Collorhabdium is a genus of snake in the family Colubridae. The genus contains the sole species Collorhabdium williamsoni. It is commonly known as the mountain dwarf snake and Williamson's reed snake. It is endemic to Malaysia.

Etymology
The specific name, williamsoni, is in honor of entomologist K.B. Williamson who collected the holotype.

Geographic range
C. williamsoni is found in Peninsular Malaysia.

Habitat

Reproduction
C. williamsoni is oviparous.

References

Further reading
Smedley N (1931). "Amphibians and Reptiles from the Cameron Highlands, Malay Peninsula". Bulletin of the Raffles Museum 6: 105–123. (Collorhabdium, new genus, p. 119; C. williamsoni, new species, pp. 120–121).

Colubrids
Monotypic snake genera
Reptiles described in 1931
Reptiles of Malaysia